The Comintern had, at the first Congress, voting delegates from the following groups:

See also
List of communist parties
List of delegates of the 1st World Congress of the Communist International
List of delegates of the 2nd Comintern congress

 
Comintern, List of members of